Minuscule 45 (in the Gregory-Aland numbering), ε 442 (Von Soden), is a Greek minuscule manuscript of the New Testament, on parchment leaves. Palaeographically it has been assigned to the 13th century. It has complex contents and full marginalia.

Description 

The codex contains the text of the four Gospels on 398 leaves (size ) with only one lacunae (Mark 2:5-15). The text is written in one column per page, 19-21 lines per page in very neat minuscule letters. The initial letters in gold or red.

There is also another division according to the smaller Ammonian Sections (in Matthew 355, Mark 233 – 16:8; Luke 342, John 230 sections), with references to the Eusebian Canons.

Text 

The Greek text of the codex is a representative of the Byzantine text-type. Hermann von Soden included it to the textual family Kx. Kurt and Barbara Aland placed it in Category V.
According to the Claremont Profile Method it represents the textual family Kx in Luke 1 and Luke 20. In Luke 10 no profile was made.

History 

The manuscript was dated by Gregory to the 14th century. Currently it has been assigned by the INTF to the 13th century.

The codex was brought from Athos to England by César de Missy (1703-1775), French chaplain of George III, King of England, who spent his life in collecting materials for an edition of the New Testament. It was examined by Mill (Bodl. 1), Griesbach, and Wetstein in 1746.

It was added to the list of the New Testament manuscripts by Wettstein. C. R. Gregory saw it in 1883.

It is currently housed in at the Bodleian Library (Barocci 31), at Oxford.

See also 

 List of New Testament minuscules
 Biblical manuscript
 Textual criticism

References

Further reading 

 Giancarlo Prato, Scritture librarie arcaizzanti della prima età dei Paleologi e loro modelli [first published 1979], reprinted in his collected articles, Studi di paleografia greca, Spoleto 1994, pp. 73–114, Tavv. 1-24, at pp. 78, 85, 109 n. 87

External links 

 MS. Barocci 31 Images available on Digital Bodleian
 MS. Barocci 31 In the Bodleian Libraries Catalogue of Medieval Manuscripts

Greek New Testament minuscules
13th-century biblical manuscripts
Bodleian Library collection